Colloquio is an experimental-songwriter band founded in 1993 by Gianni Pedretti in Bologna, Italy. As its main singer, songwriter, and instrumentalist, Pedretti is the only official member of Colloquio and remains solely responsible for its musical direction. Colloquio's music is a blend of experimental, electronic arrangements with the Italian lyrics of Pedretti always in the foreground.

Band members
Gianni Pedretti - vocals, piano, synthesizer
Sergio Calzoni - synthesizer, sound-design

Guest Musicians
Stefano Nieri - guitars
Stefano Castrucci - guitars
Stefano Lambertini - sound engineer
Matteo Mattioli - synthesizer, drum-programming

Discography 
Tapes
 "Il giardino delle lacrime" (1993)
 "Inferno" (1994)
 "Le dolci carezze della tristezza" (1994)
 "Lettere a una tessitrice d'ombra" (1995 - split with Menarca)
 "Io e l'altro" (1995)

Albums
 "...e lo spettacolo continua" (1997 - selfproduced)
 "Va tutto bene" (2001 - Eibon Records)
 "Si muove e ride" (2007 - Eibon Records)
 "L'entrata - L'uscita" (2013 - Eibon Records)

Compilations
 "Dissolution Fahrenheit" (1997 - Eibon Records/L'Alternative Dramatique)
 "Intimations of Immortalità Vol 4" (2003 - Energeia - featuring the track "Metamorfosi")

Soundtracks
 "Mondo Boiazzo" (1996 - featuring the track "Cisti")

Other works / Collaborations
 Alma Mater "Il parco degli arcobaleni" (1997 - Toast Records - Pedretti sings in the eponymous title-track)
 Canaan "A calling to weakness" (2002 - Eibon Records - Pedretti sings in "Un ultimo patetico addio" and "Essere nulla")
 Canaan "The unsaid words" (2005 - Eibon Records - Pedretti sings in "Il rimpianto" and "Senza una risposta")
 Neronoia "Un mondo in me" (2006 - Eibon Records)
 Neronoia "Il rumore delle cose" (2008 - Eibon Records)

External links 
 www.colloquio.eu - official site of the band.
 Eibon Records - record label website.

Italian rock music groups